Hylaeamys tatei, also known as Tate's oryzomys or Tate's rice rat, is a South American rodent species of the family Cricetidae. It is known only from the eastern foothills of the Andes in central Ecuador, where it has been found at elevations from 1130 to 1520 m. H. tatei is most closely related to H. yunganus, which occurs throughout Amazonia. The species is found in tropical rainforest and is terrestrial and probably nocturnal. It is named after American zoologist George Henry Hamilton Tate.

References

Literature cited

 

Mammals of Ecuador
Hylaeamys
Mammals described in 1998
Taxa named by Michael D. Carleton